Two Japanese destroyers have been named Tsubaki:

 , an  launched in 1918 she was stricken in 1935
 , a  launched in 1944 and scrapped in 1948

Imperial Japanese Navy ship names
Japanese Navy ship names